Jeffrey Webb (born October 27, 1998) is a Malaysian alpine ski racer. He represented Malaysia at the 2018 and 2022 Winter Olympics. As the first Malaysian to qualify, he was one of the first to compete for Malaysia at the Winter Olympics. He also competed in the 2017 Asian Winter Games.

Career
He competed for Malaysia at the 2017 Asian Winter Games in Sapporo, Japan. This was the first time Malaysia had participated in alpine skiing in the Asian Winter Games. He has also competed in various championships and races throughout North America.

He represented Malaysia at the 2018 Winter Olympics in Pyeongchang, South Korea. He was one of the first Malaysians to participate in the Winter Olympics, the other being Julian Yee.

In 2019 he qualified for the World Junior Alpine Skiing Championships in Val di Fassa, Trentino, Italy, but ultimately did not start.

He competed in the 2022 Winter Olympics in Beijing, China under the Malaysian flag alongside Aruwin Salehhuddin, who also competed in alpine skiing. They were also Malaysia's flagbearers during the opening ceremony. He was the flag bearer during the closing ceremony.

Asian Winter Games results

Olympic results

References

External links

Living people
1998 births
Alpine skiers at the 2017 Asian Winter Games
Malaysian people of American descent
Malaysian people of Malay descent
Malaysian Muslims
People from Selangor
Olympic alpine skiers of Malaysia
Alpine skiers at the 2018 Winter Olympics
Alpine skiers at the 2022 Winter Olympics
Malaysian male alpine skiers